Aaron Marcus (born 22 May 1943) is an American user-interface and information-visualization designer, as well as a computer graphics artist.

Biography 
Marcus was always interested in both science and technology as well as visual communication. He grew up in Omaha, Nebraska, in the 1950s, he was interested in astronomy and paleontology, and drawing cartoons. He learned painting, and calligraphy. In secondary school, he studied science and art, and was editor of his high-school newspaper.

He graduated with an A.B. in physics from Princeton University in 1965 after completing a senior thesis, titled "Determination of the (1,0,0) electronic effective mass in a gallium phosphide semiconductor by means of Raman scattering", under the supervision of John Hopfield. 
He obtained his BFA and MFA in 1968 at  Yale University’s School of Art and Architecture.
He learned about painting, drawing, printmaking, and letterpress printing workshops informally, photography, and art history. He also learned about book design, calligraphy, color, graphic design, drawing, film making, printing, printmaking, painting, typography, and photography.

At Yale, while a design graduate student, he also began the study of computer graphics, taking a course in basic functioning of computers, and he learned FORTRAN programming at the Yale Computer Center in the summer of 1966.

Work 
In 1967, Marcus spent a summer making ASCII art as a researcher at AT&T’s Bell Laboratories in Murray Hill, New Jersey.

From 1968 to 1977, in the School of Architecture and Urban Planning and in the Visual Arts Program, he taught at Princeton University: color, computer art, computer graphics, concrete/visual poetry, environmental graphics, exhibit design, graphic design, history/philosophy of design/visual communication, information design, information visualization, layout, publication design, systematic design, semiotics/semiologie, typography, and visual design.

In 1969-1971, he programmed a prototype desktop publishing page-layout application for AT&T Bell Labs.
In 1971-1973, he claims to have programmed some of the first virtual reality art/design spaces ever created while a faculty member at Princeton University.

In the early 1980s, he was a Staff Scientist at Lawrence Berkeley Laboratory in Berkeley, as well as a faculty member of the University of California at Berkeley’s College of Environmental Design.

In 1982, he founded Aaron Marcus and Associates, Inc. (AM+A), a user-interface design and consulting company, one of the first such independent, computer-based design firms in the world.

Articles and papers 
Marcus has written over 250 articles, some of which have been published in trade journals. A selection of his published papers follows:
 Marcus, Aaron. "Playing with Type: The Work of Chang Sik Kim." Forward, in Typogram: Visual Pun, Exhibition Book, "Doo Sung Design Gallery Publishers, Seoul, South Korea,  26 March-6 April 2011, (in English, Korean, and Chinese), pp. 31-35.
 Marcus, Aaron. "Diagrams: Past, Present, and Future," An Introduction, in, Gauguin, Jan, Designing Diagrams: Making Information Accessible through Design. Amsterdam: BIS Publishers, 2011, pp. 6–7.
 Marcus, Aaron. "Branding the User Experience." On the Edge Column, User Experience Magazine. 10:3, 3rd Quarter, 2011, p. 30.
 Marcus, Aaron, and Gould, Emilie. "Conducting a Culture Audit for Saudi Arabia" Multilingual, Issue 120,  22:4, June 2011, pp. 42–46.
 Marcus, Aaron, and Jean, Jérémie. "Green Machine: Designing Mobile Information Displays to Encourage Energy Conservation." Information Design Journal, 17:3, 2010, pp. 233–243.
 Marcus, Aaron. "Branding the User Experience." On the Edge Column, User Experience Magazine. 10:3, 3rd Quarter, 2011, p. 30.
 Marcus, Aaron. "UX Storytelling." Book Review, User Experience Magazine. 10:1, 1st Quarter, 2011, p. 30.
 Marcus, Aaron, My Journey: From Physics to Graphic Design, to User-Interface / Information-Visualization Design, in Alexberg, Mel, (Ed.), Educating Artists for the Future: Learning at the Intersections of Art, Science, Technology, and Culture, Chicago, IL: University of Chicago Press, Spring 2008, 192 pp.
 Global/Intercultural User-Interface Design, in Jacko, J. and Spears, A. (Eds.), Chapter 18, Handbook of Human-Computer Interaction, Third Edition. New York, NY: Lawrence Erlbaum Publishers, 2007, pp. 355–380.
 The Sun Rises in the East, Fast Forward Column, Interactions, 14: 6, November–December 2007, pp. 44–45

Books 
Marcus has written/co-written six books. Here is a selection:

 Baecker, Ron, and Marcus, Aaron. Human Factors and Typography for More Readable Programs. Reading: Addison-Wesley Longman, 1990.
 Marcus, Aaron. Graphic Design for Electronic Documents and User Interfaces. Reading: Addison-Wesley Longman, 1992.
 Marcus, Aaron,  Smilonich, Nick, and Thompson, Lynne. The Cross-GUI Handbook for Multiplatform User-Interface Design. Reading: Addison-Wesley Longman, 1994.
 Marcus, Aaron, Anxo Cereijo Roba, and Riccardo Sala. Mobile TV: Customizing Content and Experience. London: Springer, 2010.

Honors 
The Association for Computing Machinery (ACM) Special Interest Group for Computer-Human Interaction (SIGCHI) elected Aaron Marcus in 2008 to its highest honor, the CHI Academy. He has also been named a Distinguished Engineer by the ACM (2011) 
The American Institute of Graphic Arts (AIGA) through its Center for Cross-Cultural Design named Aaron Marcus an AIGA Fellow beginning June 2007.
The International Council of Graphic Design Associations (ICOGRADA) included Aaron Marcus in its publication Masters of the 20th Century published in 2000.

Notes

External links 
Aaron Marcus and Associates (AM+A) home page
Information Design Special Aaron Marcus Interview
Web2 Expo
AIGA
HCI International 2011

1943 births
Yale University alumni
Princeton University alumni
Human–computer interaction
Living people
American businesspeople
American graphic designers
Visualization (research)
User interfaces